The Jenkins–Whelden Farmstead is a historic farmstead in Barnstable, Massachusetts.  It is one of Barnstable's best-preserved farm properties.  The farm complex includes a c. 1840 house, an older 18th century house that is used as a toolshed, two barns, and several other small outbuildings.  The current main house is a three-bay -story Cape cottage with Federal styling.  The toolshed is believed to have been built by Thomas Jenkins (1666-1745), and was part of a larger house which was originally located on Church Street.

The property was listed on the National Register of Historic Places in 1987.

See also
National Register of Historic Places listings in Barnstable County, Massachusetts

References

Farms on the National Register of Historic Places in Massachusetts
Buildings and structures in Barnstable, Massachusetts
National Register of Historic Places in Barnstable, Massachusetts